Outflow may refer to:
Capital outflow, the capital leaving a particular economy
Bipolar outflow, in astronomy, two continuous flows of gas from the poles of a star
Outflow (hydrology), the discharge of a lake or other reservoir system
Outflow (meteorology), air that flows outwards from a thunderstorm
Outflow boundary, in atmospheric science, separating thunderstorm-cooled air from the surrounding air